Curt Siewert (5 April 1899 – 13 June 1983) was a general in the Wehrmacht of Nazi Germany during World War II and in the Bundeswehr of West Germany. He was a recipient of the Knight's Cross of the Iron Cross of Nazi Germany. He joined the Bundeswehr in 1956 and retired in 1960.

Awards and decorations

 Knight's Cross of the Iron Cross on 29 February 1944 as Generalmajor and commander of 58. Infanterie-Division

References

Citations

Bibliography

1899 births
1983 deaths
Bundeswehr generals
German Army personnel of World War I
German prisoners of war in World War II held by the United Kingdom
Lieutenant generals of the German Army (Wehrmacht)
Major generals of the German Army
People from the Province of Schleswig-Holstein
People from Ratzeburg
Recipients of the clasp to the Iron Cross, 1st class
Recipients of the Gold German Cross
Recipients of the Knight's Cross of the Iron Cross
Military personnel from Schleswig-Holstein